Peerless Group is an Indian business conglomerate headquartered in Kolkata, West Bengal. It was established in 1932 by industrialist Radhashyam Roy (then a School Teacher) in Narayanganj, Bangladesh.

Its major holding company is Peerless General Finance & Investment Co Ltd, which is the India's Registered Residuary Non-banking Company. It has subsidiaries like Peerless Hospital, Bengal Peerless (real estate), Kaizen Holidays, Peerless Hotels, Peerless Sports Club and Peerless Securities.

History
The Peerless Insurance Company Limited was founded  in Narayanganj, Bangladesh by Radhyashyam Roy in 1932, soon after he was joined by his friend K. K Chatterjee and they started Provident Fund, with an investment of Rs. 20,000. The company shifted base to Calcutta (now Kolkata) in 1935, which led to rapid increase in its fortunes.

References 

Life insurance companies of India
Financial services companies of India
Companies based in Kolkata
Conglomerate companies established in 1932
Conglomerate companies of India
Financial services companies established in 1932
Indian companies established in 1932